Clunie Water is a river of Aberdeenshire, Scotland. It is a tributary of the River Dee, joining the river at Braemar, among grey stone buildings. Callater Burn is a tributary of the Clunie; the confluence is at Auchallater. The river flows alongside the A93 road.

Bridges and pathways
A Grade B listed building, it was completed in around 1749. On a 1776 Taylor and Skinner Map it was labelled "East Bridge".

In June 2010, a new  link path opened, leading from Highland Society Bridge over Clunie Water to the Glenshee Road.

Fishing
During the fishing season, from March to September, permits are granted for fishing brown trout along the river.

References

External links

Rivers of Aberdeenshire